{{Automatic taxobox
| image = Cura_foremanii.jpg
| image_caption = Cura foremanii
| taxon = Cura
| authority = Strand, 1942
| subdivision_ref = <ref>Tyler S, Schilling S, Hooge M, and Bush LF (comp.) (2006-2012) Turbellarian taxonomic database. Version 1.7  Database </ref>
| subdivision = C. foremaniiC. fortisC. pinguis}}Cura is a genus of freshwater flatworm (triclad)s belonging to the family Dugesiidae.Cura was ranked as a subgenus of Dugesia until 1974, then it was elevated to the genus rank.

Description
Individuals of this genus have a low triangle-shaped head.

DistributionCura species present a disjunct distribution. C. foremanii inhabits North America, while C. fortis is found in New Zealand, and C. pinguis'' in Australia, New Zealand, and New Caledonia.

Phylogeny
Phylogenetic tree including five dugesiid genera after Álvarez-Presas et al., 2008:

References

Dugesiidae
Taxa named by Embrik Strand
Rhabditophora genera